Group A was one of eight groups at the 2002 FIFA World Cup. It consisted of defending champions France, two-time winners Uruguay, Denmark and debutants Senegal. The group's first match was played on 31 May 2002 and the last on 11 June 2002.

From the outset, it was apparent that the group would not pan out as expected, as Senegal beat France 1–0 in the opening match of the tournament. France followed this with a goalless draw against Uruguay, in a match in which their star striker Thierry Henry was sent off, before rounding out the group with another defeat to Denmark. Senegal's other two matches finished as draws, including a well-earned point against Denmark and a bad-tempered game against Uruguay, in which 12 players were booked.

Denmark started the group well, beating Uruguay in Ulsan, before a late Senegalese equaliser in Daegu prevented them from qualifying for the round of 16 with a match to spare. Instead, they were forced to play France, knowing that a draw would see them through to the next round. They won 2–0 and finished top of the group thanks to Senegal's draw with Uruguay.

Dark horses Uruguay never really got going, with their high point being a goalless draw with a sub-par French side. They did manage to put three goals past Senegal in a high-scoring draw, but their loss to Denmark in their opening match had dashed any hopes they may have had of reaching the next round.

Standings

Denmark advanced to play England (runner-up of Group F) in the round of 16.
Senegal advanced to play Sweden (winner of Group F) in the round of 16.

Matches
All times are local (UTC+9)

France vs Senegal

Uruguay vs Denmark

Denmark vs Senegal

France vs Uruguay

Denmark vs France

Senegal vs Uruguay

External links
 Results

A
France at the 2002 FIFA World Cup
Denmark at the 2002 FIFA World Cup
Uruguay at the 2002 FIFA World Cup
Senegal at the 2002 FIFA World Cup